Atwater is an unincorporated community located in the town of Chester, Dodge County, Wisconsin, United States. It was named Mill Creek until a settler from Atwater, Ohio changed the name to Atwater in 1856.

Notes

Unincorporated communities in Dodge County, Wisconsin
Unincorporated communities in Wisconsin